Kozłowiecki forest is a forest located in the Lubartów County, Lublin Voivodeship in Poland, south of the town of Lubartów. It forms part of the Kozłowiecki Landscape Park.

Forests of Poland
Geography of Lublin Voivodeship